Kul Bayt Lahu Rajel   (Every House Has Its Man) is a 1949 Egyptian drama film. It starred Abdel Alim Khattab, Faten Hamama, Mahmoud El Meliguy, and Amina Rizk. The film was directed by Ahmed Morsi.

The film is about a man who dies leaving behind a widow and her daughter. One day, the mother meets a man, who she later falls in love with. Her daughter also loves him, and is devastated after discovering that she left her boyfriend for a man who is having a relationship with her mother.

Cast 
Faten Hamama as Faten
Mahmoud El-Meliguy as Amin
Amina Rizk as the Mother
Abdel Alim Khattab

References 
 Film summary, Faten Hamama's official site. Retrieved on January 4, 2007.

External links 
 

1949 films
1940s Arabic-language films
1949 drama films
Egyptian drama films
Egyptian black-and-white films